The White Family Rotary or White FR, later White Rotary or White Rotary Electric, was the first rotary hook sewing machine produced by the White Sewing Machine Company, introduced circa 1900.    It joined the successful White Vibrating Shuttle on White's expanding product line and eventually eclipsed it.  It was originally sold as a treadle with cabinet or as a hand-crank with carrying case. Later, add-on electric motors with foot or knee control were available pre-installed or as a field upgrade.  Typical cost for this machine as a treadle with a cabinet was US$65 in 1909, which is about US$1532 adjusted. <p>The White Rotary was sold under multiple brands, including Domestic, Franklin, and Kenmore. A White Rotary Electric Series 77 machine was placed in the Crypt of Civilization.
White reused the White Rotary name in the 1950s and 1960s, applying it to a machine manufactured by Juki (White model #659). This machine had a rotary-driven thread takeup instead of the more common takeup lever. The Rotary name was later used again on a stretch stitch-capable sewing machine.

Notes

References 

Sewing machines